Tymoteusz Zimny (born 14 March 1998) is a Polish sprinter specialising in the 400 metres. He represented his country in the 4 × 400 metres relay at the 2017 World Championships reaching the final. In addition, he won two medals at the 2017 European U20 Championships.

International competitions

Personal bests

Outdoor
400 metres – 46.04 (Grosseto 2017)
Indoor
200 metres – 22.47 (Toruń 2016)
400 metres – 47.26 (Toruń 2017)

References

1998 births
Living people
Polish male sprinters
World Athletics Championships athletes for Poland
People from Szamotuły County
Sportspeople from Greater Poland Voivodeship
20th-century Polish people
21st-century Polish people